Tolna  strandi is a species of moth of the family Erebidae.

It is found in Cameroon.

References
Bryk, F. 1915. Neue exotische, insbesondere aethiopische Schmetterlinge. - Archiv für Naturgeschichte 81(A4)(4):1–16, pl. 1

Erebinae